Debra Drimmer, more commonly known as Debbie Drimmer, (born ca. 1963, New York City, New York) was formerly Vice President of Talent at Comedy Central from March 1996 until March 2004.

Early life and education
Drimmer is a 1981 graduate of George W. Hewlett High School and graduated from SUNY Oneonta with a B.A. degree in 1985.

Career
Drimmer was Senior Talent Coordinator at Late Night and then the Late Show with David Letterman from February 1992 through March 1996.,

She has a notable appearance on Last Comic Standing in the Season 2 episode where the comics had to perform in a laundromat.

Drimmer was a Production and Talent Coordinator for Night Flight.

Filmography
As producer:
Comedy Central's Bar Mitzvah Bash! (2004) as Executive In Charge Of Talent (Comedy Central)
Out On The Edge (2004) as Executive In Charge Of Talent
Denis Leary: Behind the Anger (2003) as Talent Executive (Comedy Central) 
Comedy Central Roast of Denis Leary, The (2003) as Talent Executive (Comedy Central) 
Wanda Sykes: Tongue Untied (2003) as Executive In Charge Of Talent 
Jay Mohr: My Turn (2003) as Executive In Charge Of Talent 
Commies, The (2003) as Executive In Charge Of Talent (Comedy Central) 
Comedy Central Presents The NY Friars Club Roast of Chevy Chase (2002) as Executive In Charge Of Talent 
Tracy Morgan: One Mic (2002) as Executive In Charge Of Talent 
Uncomfortably Close With Michael McKean: George Carlin (2001) as Executive In Charge Of Talent 
Uncomfortably Close With Michael McKean: Harold Ramis (2001) as Executive In Charge Of Talent 
Comedy Central Presents the New York Friars Club Roast of Hugh M. Hefner (2001) as Executive In Charge Of Talent 
Kevin James: Sweat the Small Stuff (2001) as Executive In Charge Of Talent 
Comedy Central Presents Hef's Pre-Roast Party (2001) as Executive In Charge Of Talent 
Uncomfortably Close With Michael McKean: Jonathan Winters (2000) as Executive In Charge Of Talent 
Comedy Central Presents the New York Friars Club Roast of Rob Reiner, The (2000) as Executive In Charge Of Talent 
Canned Ham: Eric Idle (2000) as Executive In Charge Of Talent 
All-Access Pass: A Behind-The-Scenes Look at the 14th Annual American Comedy Awards (2000) as Executive In Charge Of Talent 
Uncomfortably Close With Michael McKean: Rob Reiner (2000) as Executive In Charge Of Talent 
Uncomfortably Close With Michael McKean: Jerry Stiller (1999) as Executive In Charge Of Talent 
Comedy Rx: Comics Come Home 5 (1999) as Executive In Charge Of Talent 
Canned Ham: The Spy Who Shagged Me (1999) as Executive In Charge Of Talent 
Comedy Central Presents the New York Friars Club Roast of Jerry Stiller, The (1999) as Executive In Charge Of Talent 
Uncomfortably Close With Michael McKean: Jason Alexander (1999) as Executive In Charge Of Production
Comics Come Home 4 (1998) as Executive In Charge Of Talent

External links

'Last Comic Standing': Good for laughs

References

Television producers from New York City
American women television producers
George W. Hewlett High School alumni
People from North Woodmere, New York
People from Brooklyn
Living people
Late Show with David Letterman
Year of birth missing (living people)